2C-B-FLY is a psychedelic phenethylamine and designer drug of the 2C family. It was first synthesized in 1996 by Aaron P. Monte.

Chemistry

2C-B-FLY is 8-bromo-2,3,6,7-benzo-dihydro-difuran-ethylamine. The full name of the chemical is 2-(8-bromo-2,3,6,7-tetrahydrofuro[2,3-f] [1]benzofuran-4-yl)ethanamine. It has been subject to little formal study, but its appearance as a designer drug has led the DEA to release analytical results for 2C-B-FLY and several related compounds.

Analogues and derivatives

In theory, dihydrodifuran analogues of any of the 2Cx / DOx family of drugs could be made, and would be expected to show similar activity to the parent compound. So in the same way that 2C-B-FLY is the dihydrodifuran analogue of 2C-B, the 8-iodo equivalent 2C-I-FLY would be the dihydrodifuran analogue of 2C-I, and the 8-methyl equivalent 2C-D-FLY would be the dihydrodifuran analogue of 2C-D.

Other related compounds can also be produced, where the alpha carbon of the ethylamine chain is methylated, the amphetamine derivative DOB-FLY can be made, this compound being the dihydrodifuran analogue of DOB, or conversely can be viewed as the saturated derivative of Bromo-DragonFLY.

Where only one methoxy group of a 2Cx drug is cyclised into a dihydrofuran ring, the resulting compound is known as a "hemifly", and when an unsaturated furan ring is used, the compound is known as a "hemi-dragonfly". The larger saturated hexahydrobenzodipyran ring derivatives have been referred to as "butterfly" compounds. The 8-bromo group can also be replaced by other groups to give compounds such as TFMFly.

A large number of symmetrical and unsymmetrical derivatives can be produced by using different combinations of ring systems. Because the 2- and 5- positions (using phenethylamine numbering scheme, 1,5-positions if numbered as benzodifuran) are not equivalent, all unsymmetrical combinations also have two possible positional isomers, with different potencies at the various 5-HT2 subtypes. Isomeric "Ψ"-derivatives with the oxygens positioned at the 2,6- positions, and mescaline analogues with the oxygens at 3,5- have also been made, but both are less potent than the corresponding 2,5- isomers. The symmetrical aromatic benzodifuran derivatives tend to have the highest binding affinity at 5-HT2A, but the saturated benzodifuran derivatives have higher efficacy, while the saturated benzodipyran derivatives are more selective for 5-HT2C. A large number of possible combinations have been synthesised and tested for activity, but these represent only a fraction of the many variations that could be produced.

Dosage
Alexander Shulgin lists a dosage of 2C-B-FLY at 10 mg orally.

Toxicity
The toxicity of 2C-B-FLY in humans is unknown.  Two deaths occurred in October 2009, in Denmark and the United States, after ingestion of a substance that was sold as 2C-B-FLY in a small-time RC shop, but in fact consisted of Bromo-DragonFLY contaminated with a small amount of unidentified impurities.

History
In 2019, it became part of a group of molecules studied by the french laboratory Caulredaitens.

Legality

Canada
As of October 31, 2016; 2C-B-FLY is a controlled substance (Schedule III) in Canada.

United States
2C-B-FLY is unscheduled and uncontrolled in the United States.  However, it may fall under the scope of the Federal Analog Act if it is intended for human consumption given its similarity to 2C-B.

Pharmacology
The hallucinogenic effect of 2C-B-FLY is mediated by its partial agonistic activity at the 5-HT2A serotonin receptor, but also has a high binding affinity for the 5-HT1D, 5-HT1E, 5-HT1A, 5-HT2B and  5-HT2C receptors.

Researchers suspect that 2C-B-FLY may have a MAOI action, making it dangerous to mix it with drugs like MDMA or Tramadol.

References

External links
 2C-B-FLY Entry at Erowid
 2C-B-FLY Entry at Isomerdesign

2C (psychedelics)
Bromoarenes
Designer drugs
Entactogens and empathogens
Phenethylamines
Psychedelic phenethylamines
Serotonin receptor agonists
Substances discovered in the 1990s